You Never Can Tell is a 1920 American romantic comedy film produced by the Realart company, an affiliate of Paramount Pictures, and distributed by Realart. Chester M. Franklin directed and Bebe Daniels starred in the film. The film is based on several short stories You Never Can Tell and Class by Grace Lovell Bryan. A surviving print of the film is housed in the Library of Congress.

Cast
 Bebe Daniels - Rowena Patricia Jones
 Jack Mulhall - Prince
 Edward Martindel - William Vaughn
 Helen Dunbar - Mrs. Vaughn
 Harold Goodwin - Jimmy Flannery
 Neely Edwards - Mysterious Sport
 Leo White - Mr. Renan
 Milla Davenport - Mrs. Jones
 Graham Pettie - Wilberforce Jones
 Gertrude Short - Vera

References

External links

 
 

1920 films
1920s English-language films
1920 romantic comedy films
American romantic comedy films
American silent feature films
American black-and-white films
Films based on short fiction
Films directed by Chester Franklin
1920s American films
Silent romantic comedy films
Silent American comedy films